The Real Housewives of Beverly Hills (abbreviated RHOBH) is an American reality television series which has been broadcast on Bravo since October 14, 2010. Developed as the sixth installment in The Real Housewives franchise, it has aired twelve seasons and focuses on the personal and professional lives of several women living in or around Beverly Hills, California.

The cast of the most recent season consists of: Kyle Richards, Lisa Rinna, Erika Girardi, Dorit Kemsley, Garcelle Beauvais, Sutton Stracke, Crystal Kung Minkoff and Diana Jenkins, with Kathy Hilton and Sheree Zampino serving as "friends of the housewives".

The success of the show has resulted in two spin-offs: Vanderpump Rules and Vanderpump Dogs, both featuring original cast member Lisa Vanderpump.

Overview and casting

Seasons 1–4 
The Real Housewives of Beverly Hills was announced in March 2010 as the sixth series in The Real Housewives franchise. The first season premiered on October 14, 2010, and starred Kyle Richards, Adrienne Maloof, Kim Richards, Lisa Vanderpump, Camille Grammer and Taylor Armstrong. The series received a 2011 Critics Choice Award for best reality series.

The second season premiered on September 5, 2011, with Brandi Glanville and Dana Wilkey introduced as what were called "friends of the housewives." The second season was re-edited after the death of Taylor Armstrong's husband, Russell Armstrong, who died by suicide on August 15, 2011. Meyer left the main cast after the second season.

The third season aired on November 5, 2012. Glanville was upgraded to a main cast member and Yolanda Foster was added to the series. Marisa Zanuck and Faye Resnick were introduced as friends of the housewives, along with Meyer who was reduced to a friend capacity. Maloof did not return for the fourth season after refusing to attend the season three reunion.

The fourth season premiered on November 4, 2013, with Carlton Gebbia and Joyce Giraud joining the cast. Armstrong was featured in a guest capacity. Giraud and Gebbia were not asked back after the fourth season.

Seasons 5–8 
The fifth season premiered on November 18, 2014, featuring Lisa Rinna and Eileen Davidson as the new housewives. Maloof, Meyer, and Armstrong participated in that season as guests. Kim Richards and Glanville were not asked back for the sixth season as regular cast members.

Erika Jayne and Kathryn Edwards joined the show's sixth season which premiered on December 1, 2015. Kim Richards, Meyer, Armstrong, Resnick, Maloof, and Glanville returned in guest appearances, alongside Bethenny Frankel of The Real Housewives of New York City. The season served as the final season for Hadid, and the only season for Edwards.

The seventh season premiered on December 6, 2016, with new cast member, Dorit Kemsley. Eden Sassoon joined the show in a recurring capacity, whilst Meyer also made regular appearances throughout the season, alongside Kim Richards who served as a friend. Davidson, Sassoon and Kim Richards left the series after the seventh season.

The eighth season premiered on December 19, 2017, with the addition of Teddi Mellencamp Arroyave as a new cast member. Meyer returned as a friend of the housewives, while Davidson, Resnick, and Maloof appeared as guests, along with Frankel.

Seasons 9–present 
The ninth season premiered on February 12, 2019. It featured all six cast members from the previous season, with Denise Richards joining the cast. Grammer Meyer returned once again as a friend of the housewives, while Kim Richards, Glanville, and Resnick all appeared as guests. Vanderpump exited the show after the ninth season and did not attend the season nine reunion.

Garcelle Beauvais joined the cast, as a main cast member, in the tenth season, which premiered on April 15, 2020. Sutton Stracke also debuted in the show, as a friend of the housewives. Meyer, Kim Richards, Maloof, Glanville, Davidson, and Resnick also made guest appearances during the season. Denise Richards announced her departure from the show after the tenth season, while Mellencamp was dismissed from the cast; the grounds for Mellencamp's dismissal were not made fully clear at the time.

The eleventh season, which premiered on May 19, 2021, featured Crystal Kung Minkoff joining the show and Stracke joining the main cast, while Kathy Hilton formally joined the cast in a "friend of the housewives" capacity after having appeared sporadically throughout the series since its inception. Former housewife Mellencamp Arroyave made a guest appearance in the season.

The twelfth season, which premiered on May 11, 2022, featured the entire cast of the eleventh season returning, with new housewife Diana Jenkins and new friend of the housewives Sheree Zampino joining the cast. Former cast members Mellencamp Arroyave, and Resnick made guest appearances.

In January 2023, Rinna announced her exit from the show following the conclusion of the twelfth series, as did Jenkins after only one season.

Cast

Timeline of cast members

Episodes

Broadcast history
The Real Housewives of Beverly Hills airs regularly on Bravo in the United States; most episodes are approximately forty-two to forty-four minutes in length, and are broadcast in standard definition and high definition. Since its premiere, the series has alternated airing on Monday, Tuesday, Wednesday, and Thursday evenings and has been frequently shifted between the 8:00, 9:00, and 10:00 PM timeslots.

In popular culture
The music video for Lady Gaga's 2014 song "G.U.Y." features then-cast members from season four.

In 2014, Camille Grammer, Kyle Richards and Brandi Glanville appeared in the comedy film The Hungover Games, making cameo appearances as Housewives.

In 2019, a screen cap from the season two episode "Malibu Beach Party from Hell" began trending as the "Woman yelling at a cat" meme, featuring cast members Taylor Armstrong and Kyle Richards followed by a picture of a cat sitting at a dinner table. It later won Meme of the Year at the Shorty Awards in 2020, with Armstrong virtually accepting the award.

In 2021, Brandi Glanville joined RHOA star Kenya Moore and RHOP star Candiace Dillard Bassett in a parody of the Real Housewives franchise on a show called Family Reunion.

References

External links

 
 
 

 
2010 American television series debuts
2010s American reality television series
2020s American reality television series
Bravo (American TV network) original programming
English-language television shows
Television shows set in Beverly Hills, California